The Master of the Acquavella Still-Life was an Italian painter, in the Baroque style, who was active in Rome during the 1610s and 20s and specialized in still-lifes.

Works
The notname he has been given derives from his work, "Natura morta con vaso di fiori, frutta e frutti del campo" (Still-life with a Flower Vase, Fruit and Fruit of the Fields), which is currently in New York at the Acquavella Galleries. Based on an analysis of style, technique and materials, several other works have been assigned to the same artist.

He painted with a remarkable attention to detail and filled his canvases with flowers and fruits until they seem to burst at the frame. His works are a perfect example of the opulent styles developed in Italy during the Baroque period, as opposed to the prevailing still-life style from the Netherlands, which is more restrained, with elements of morbidity related to the transience of life (hence the Italian term for still-life, "natura morta"; dead nature)

The following painters have been proposed as the Master's true identity: Luca Forte from Bottari, Angelo Caroselli from Bologna, Giovanni Battista Crescenzi from Rome and Pietro Paolini from Salerno. None of these artists are currently favored over the others.

Identification is made more difficult by the fact that most of his works are privately owned.

References

Further reading 
 Federico Zeri, Alberto Cottino, La natura morta italiana, II, p. 712-715, 1989 
 Alberto Cottino, La natura morta a Roma : il naturalismo caravaggesco, Exhibition catalog, Florence, pgs.125-126, 2003

External links

 More works by the Master @ ArtNet

17th-century Italian painters
Italian Baroque painters
Italian still life painters
Acquavella Still-Life